James M. Trout (April 9, 1850 – July 27, 1910) was a United States Navy sailor and a recipient of the United States military's highest decoration, the Medal of Honor.

Born on April 9, 1850, in Philadelphia, Pennsylvania, Trout joined the Navy from that state. On that day, while Frolic was at Montevideo, Uruguay, he attempted to rescue a shipmate from drowning. For this action, he was awarded the Medal of Honor. He died at age 60 on July 27, 1910, and was buried at Fernwood Cemetery in Fernwood, Delaware County, Pennsylvania.

Trout's official Medal of Honor citation reads:
Serving on board the U.S.S. Frolic, Trout displayed gallant conduct in endeavoring to save the life of one of the crew of that vessel who had fallen overboard at Montevideo, 20 April 1877.

See also

List of Medal of Honor recipients during peacetime

References

External links

1850 births
1910 deaths
Military personnel from Philadelphia
United States Navy sailors
United States Navy Medal of Honor recipients
Non-combat recipients of the Medal of Honor
Burials at Fernwood Cemetery (Lansdowne, Pennsylvania)